Staind is the seventh and the most recent studio album by American rock band Staind, released on September 13, 2011. It was released as a download, a standard CD and a limited deluxe digipak edition, which contains a DVD documenting the recording process of the album, plus two live bonus tracks (Live in Houston) for the European digipak release.

The album marks the return to the band's more aggressive heavier sound that was predominant on their first three albums. The album also returns the guitar solos of Staind's first album Tormented. It is the band's final studio album to feature the full original lineup, as drummer Jon Wysocki left the band after the recording sessions in May 2011. Rapper Snoop Dogg appears on the remix of the song "Wannabe", which appears as a Japanese bonus track.

Background and recording 
The making of Staind was a stressful experience for the group. As lead singer Aaron Lewis stated, "By the end of the first month we weren't even recording in the same places anymore."

A number of factors created some dissension within the group during recording.  Despite the deadline on the album's completion approaching, with the album less than half finished, Lewis continued to do solo gigs to promote his solo album Town Line much to the other band members' discontent. In addition Lewis' working relationship with drummer Jon Wysocki broke down completely. Wysocki's departure from the group was announced on their website in May 2011.

Many songs were released before the album's official release date. The lead single, "Not Again", was made available as a streaming video on the band's official website on July 12, 2011. It was released to radio stations on July 19, 2011. "The Bottom" was released on the Transformers: Dark of the Moon soundtrack. Additionally, "Eyes Wide Open" was released on June 30, and the song "Paper Wings" was released on August 8.

The official music video for "Not Again" premiered August 30, 2011. The single topped the Mainstream Rock Songs chart for seven non-consecutive weeks, and peaked at No. 4 on the Rock Songs chart and No. 14 on the Alternative Songs chart. The second single was confirmed as "Eyes Wide Open". "Something to Remind You", despite not being a single, peaked at No. 19 on the Bubbling Under Hot 100, due to digital downloads.  It would be released as the fourth single later on.

On September 15 Staind played a benefit concert for the September 11 victims and presented the new album. Eight of the ten total songs were performed, excluding "Take a Breath" and "Now".

Music 
The band views the album as a return to the more aggressive sound heard on earlier albums such as Dysfunction and Tormented. Mike Mushok said "It's like Dysfunction 2011. The music goes back to where we started, but there's still melody. We were ready to make an album that was heavy from beginning to end. It was time." Bassist Johnny April said "There's a deeper anger to the vocals and music. Some of the riffs Mike came up with were challenging and incredibly different. We've grown so much, and at the same time managed to find our way back to our roots."

Critical reception 

The album debuted at number 5 on the Billboard 200, with first sales week of 47,000 copies, making the fifth consecutive top-five album for the band. However, the album has spent the least weeks of any Staind studio record on the chart, falling off after eight weeks. As of November 19, it has sold over 100,000 copies.

The album received a score of 55 out of 100 from Metacritic based on "mixed or average reviews", (according to seven critic scores) with some critics, including IGN (which gave it a score of 7.5 out of 10), calling it Staind's most mature and balanced release to date and praising the band for returning to their heavier, metal roots.

Track listing 

Notes
 Kevin Curry is the guitar solo contest winner.
 The live versions of "Spleen" and "For You" come with the iTunes deluxe edition only.

Personnel 
Staind
 Aaron Lewis – vocals, rhythm guitar
 Mike Mushok – lead guitar
 Johnny April – bass
 Jon Wysocki – drums
Production
 Johnny K – producer, engineer
 Chris Lord-Alge – mixing
 Ted Jensen – mastering

Charts

Weekly charts

Year-end charts

References 

2011 albums
Atlantic Records albums
Staind albums